This is an incomplete list of the paintings of John Constable ( 11 June 1776 – 31 March 1837), an artist of the Romanticism, famous for his rural scenes.

Timeline 

 1776–1809 Early Years
 1809–1816 Early Maturity
 1817–1828 Established Londoner
 1829-1837 Late Years

Paintings by Constable 
This list includes paintings attributed to Constable.

In substitute of specific knowledge on the date of a painting's creation (in cases where this is not known), the year of exhibition has been put, is it would likely correlate. The circa date may also be put.

References 

Constable, John